Jack Harkness is a character played by John Barrowman in Doctor Who and Torchwood.

Jack Harkness may also refer to:

 "Captain Jack Harkness" (Torchwood episode), an episode of Torchwood
 Jack Harkness, played by Matt Rippy, a minor Torchwood character
 Jack Harkness (footballer, born 1907) (1907–1985), Scottish footballer
 Jack Harkness (footballer, born 2004), Scottish footballer
 Jack Harkness (1918–1994), rose breeder with Harkness Roses

See also
John Harkness (disambiguation)